Sheikh Ahmed bin Saeed Al Maktoum (born 1 December 1958) is an Emirati businessman and member of Dubai's ruling Al Maktoum family. He is the president of the Dubai Civil Aviation Authority, CEO and founder of the Emirates Group, chairman of Dubai World. 

He is also the current chancellor of The British University in Dubai, chairman of the Dubai Supreme Fiscal Committee, chairman of the Dubai Airports Company, second vice chairman of the Dubai Executive Council, and chairman of  Emirates NBD Bank PJSC.

Early years

The youngest son of Dubai's former ruler Saeed bin Maktoum bin Hasher Al Maktoum and the only child of his second wife Sheikha Fatima bint Ahmed bin Suliman, Sheikh Ahmed is the half-brother of Dubai's former ruler Rashid bin Saeed Al Maktoum and the uncle of Dubai's ruler Mohammed bin Rashid Al Maktoum.

Career
Ahmed's career in the aviation industry began in 1985, when he was appointed president of the Dubai Department of Civil Aviation (DCA) (the governing body which oversaw the activities of Dubai International and Dubai Duty Free). Emirates, the national carrier, was launched at the same time, with Ahmed appointed chairman.

He is believed to be connected to at least 14 board members in 14 organizations in 14 industries. Ahmed has been called "the man who put Dubai on the global aviation map." He has been chairman and CEO of Emirates Airline & Group since 1985. In October 2019 Al Maktoum, as president of Dubai Civil Aviation Authority (DCAA), opened a quartet of sector-specific global food trade platforms at the Dubai World Trade Centre (DWTC).

Al Maktoum was chairman of the Dubai Free Zone Council. At its 13th meeting in 2019, chaired by Al Maktoum, the members discussed initiatives and proposals for long-term rental agreements or investors and free zone passports.

He was listed in the 'Top 100 most powerful Arabs' from 2013 to 2021 by Gulf Business.

Al Maktoum is chair of the Emirates Airline Festival of Literature.

Personal life
He is a graduate of the University of Denver. He married Egyptian socialite Nivin El-Gamal in 2007. She gave birth to their only child, Saeed bin Ahmed bin Saeed Al Maktoum. Al Maktoum later married a first cousin twice removed (a regional tradition), daughter of Sheikh Obaid bin Thani Al Maktoum, in 2008. He married his cousin Moza bint Hamdan Al Malik Al Shehi in 2019, and they had a son in November 2020.

Honors and awards
 Honorary degree from City University London
 Living Legend of Aviation—2007 Aviation Entrepreneur of the Year
 Ernst & Young 2011 Entrepreneur of the Year Award for the UAE 
 Emirates Airline Festival of Literature Personality of the Year 2012 Award
 Honorary Knight Commander of The Most Excellent Order of the British Empire (2013)

References

1958 births
Living people
Ahmed bin Saeed Ali
University of Denver alumni
People from Dubai
The Emirates Group
Emirati businesspeople
Emirati airline chief executives
Commandeurs of the Légion d'honneur
Emirati billionaires
Emirati politicians
Honorary Knights Commander of the Order of the British Empire
Sons of monarchs